The Charles A. Bottger House is a historic house in the Old Town neighborhood of Albuquerque, New Mexico. It is listed on the New Mexico State Register of Cultural Properties and the National Register of Historic Places. The house was built in 1911–12 for Charles A. Bottger (1872–1914), a German-American businessman who moved to Old Town from Rutherford, New Jersey in 1889. The house was designed by local architect Edward B. Christy, who was also responsible for the remodeling of Hodgin Hall in 1908.

Built in the American Foursquare style, it is a square, two-and-a-half-story building of balloon frame construction with a shallow hipped roof. A glassed-in sun porch wraps around the south and east sides of the house, while a smaller sun porch projects from the north (rear) facade. The wide eaves are supported by paired Italianate brackets and the metal tile roof is punctuated by dormers on three sides. Inside, the house was equipped with modern conveniences like speaking tubes and a dumbwaiter and also has a notable pressed metal ceiling.

The house is currently operated as a bed and breakfast.

References

Houses on the National Register of Historic Places in New Mexico
Houses in Albuquerque, New Mexico
Houses completed in 1912
New Mexico State Register of Cultural Properties
National Register of Historic Places in Albuquerque, New Mexico
1912 establishments in New Mexico